Gmelinka is a rural locality (a selo) and the administrative center of Gmelinskoye Rural Settlement, Staropoltavsky District, Volgograd Oblast, Russia. The population was 2,017 as of 2010. There are 24 streets.

Geography 
Gmelinka is located 40 km southeast of Staraya Poltavka (the district's administrative centre) by road. Pervomaysky is the nearest rural locality.

References 

Rural localities in Staropoltavsky District